Jerry Ernest Knight (April 17, 1952 – December 29, 1996) was an American R&B vocalist and bassist who reached prominence in the late 1970s and early 1980s, during which he was part of several groups and had a brief solo career.

Career
A Los Angeles native, he first gained recognition as a founding member, along with Ray Parker Jr., of the R&B group Raydio, singing vocals on their early hit "Jack and Jill." Before the group began recording their second album, he left to pursue a solo career, going on to release three solo albums and achieving moderate success with minor hits such as "Overnight Sensation," "Perfect Fit" and "Turn It Out".

In 1983, Knight teamed with session drummer Ollie E. Brown to form Ollie & Jerry. Together, they provided the title track to the soundtrack for the 1984 movie Breakin', which reached #9 on the Billboard Hot 100 chart. They also recorded the title track for Breakin' 2: Electric Boogaloo, which got up to #45 on the Billboard R&B chart.

Shortly after Ollie & Jerry parted ways in 1985, Knight began working with the Jets, co-writing their early hits "Crush On You," "Curiosity," and "Private Number". Although his career as an artist faded, Knight continued to write and produce for other acts such as the Whispers, Patrice Rushen, DeBarge, Howard Hewett and Elkie Brooks.

Personal life and death
According to an interview with his Raydio bandmate, Ray Parker, Jr., Raydio's song "Jack and Jill" was actually written about Knight and his wife, whose real name was Jill (Maxine) Knight. Parker also added that Knight and Jill had two children together (Dereck and Lindsay).

Knight died of cancer in Los Angeles on December 29, 1996, at age 44. He is buried in Inglewood Park Cemetery.

Solo discography

Albums

Singles

Songwriting credits

References

External links
 

1952 births
1996 deaths
American rhythm and blues singers
20th-century African-American male singers
Burials at Inglewood Park Cemetery
Singers from California
Guitarists from Los Angeles
American male bass guitarists
20th-century American bass guitarists
20th-century American singers
20th-century American male singers
African-American guitarists